Iván Mauricio Casas Buitrago (born June 12, 1980 in Tunja, Boyacá) is a Colombian professional racing cyclist.

Career

2005
2nd Overall Clásica Ciudad de Girardot
1st Stage 4
2nd Overall Doble Copacabana GP Fides
1st Stage 3
2006
1st Stage 1 Doble Copacabana GP Fides
1st Stage 2 Clásica Ciudad de Girardot
2nd National Road Race Championships
2007
1st Stage 3 Giro del Friuli-Venezia Giulia
1st Overall Vuelta a Boyacà
1st Stages 3 & 5
2008
1st Stage 1 Vuelta a la Independencia Nacional
2010
1st Pan American Championships, Time Trial
1st Stage 4 Vuelta a Venezuela
2011
1st Overall Vuelta al Uruguay
1st Stage 7a
1st  Time Trial Championships
1st Overall Vuelta a Chiapas
2013
2nd National Time Trial Championships

References

1980 births
Living people
People from Tunja
Colombian male cyclists
Cyclists at the 2011 Pan American Games
Pan American Games competitors for Colombia
Sportspeople from Boyacá Department
20th-century Colombian people
21st-century Colombian people
Competitors at the 2002 Central American and Caribbean Games